Albela is a 1951 Bollywood musical comedy film directed by and starring Bhagwan Dada and Geeta Bali.
A Hindi classic, it was the third highest-grossing film at the Indian Box Office in 1951 and its soundtrack by C. Ramchandra was acclaimed.

The film was later dubbed in Tamil as Nalla Pillai in 1953.

Plot
Day-dreamer and Artist, Pyarelal, lives a poor lifestyle in Bombay with his retired dad; housewife mom; married brother, Mohan and his wife, Malti; and unmarried sister, Vimla. It is now time for Vimla to get married, her dad has saved a thousand Rupees, while Mohan has made arrangements for six hundred more, and Pyarelal is asked to arrange for four hundred. Instead Pyarelal brings home one hundred rupees, informing his family that he has been fired from his job, and will be unable to raise any more money. An argument ensues, and Pyarelal is asked to leave. He leaves, swearing only to return when he is a famous and wealthy man. He meets with pretty actress, Asha, both fall in love with each other, and he starts acting in the theater, and achieves quick success. He starts sending money and gifts home to his parents, and hopes that they will be pleased with his success. Then one day when he feels that he has achieved his success, he returns home - only to find out that the money and gifts he has been sending home are missing; his mom has passed away; his dad and sister are missing, believed to be begging in the streets; his sister's marriage has been canceled; his brother cannot support himself; and his sister-in-law, has a dark deep secret that she cannot tell anyone.

Cast
Geeta Bali as Asha
Bhagwan as Pyarelal
Badri Prasad as Pyarelal's Father
Sundar as Theatre Owner 
Pratima Devi (Hindi actress) as Pyarelal's Mother
Dulari as Malti
Bimla as Vimla
Usha Shukla			
Nihal
Maruti as Drummer
Shyamu
Baburao as Malti's brother

Soundtrack
The music director of the film was C. Ramchandra and the soundtrack was acclaimed, cited as a "classic". The film features several westernized songs such as Shola Jo Bhadke and Ye Deewana, Ye Parwana which are said to have "employed cabaret type dance/choruses featuring bongo drums, oboes, clarinets, trumpets, saxophones, etc." C.Ramachandra as Chitalkar himself sang most of the male songs in the movie while Lata Mangeshkar sang all the female songs. Apart from the highly popular Western-style songs, the movie also had classic melodies like "Dheere se aaja re ankhiyan me", "Balama bada nadan re" etc.
The soundtrack "Qismat Ki Hawa Kabhi Naram" was used in Ludo, a 2020 Indian black comedy crime film written and directed by Anurag Basu in the opening credits, climax scenes & few other parts. Original video parts from the film were also used in opening credits.

Hindi Songs

Tamil Songs

References

External links

1951 films
1950s Hindi-language films
Films scored by C. Ramchandra
Hindi-language comedy films
Indian musical comedy films
1951 musical comedy films
Indian black-and-white films